Mabelkis Capote Perez (born 5 June 1998) is a Cuban freestyle wrestler. At the 2019 Pan American Games held in Lima, Peru, she won one of the bronze medals in the 76 kg event.

At the 2018 Pan American Wrestling Championships held in Lima, Peru, she won one of the bronze medals in the women's 76 kg event. In 2018, she also won the bronze medal in the 76 kg event at the Central American and Caribbean Games held in Barranquilla, Colombia.

Achievements

References

External links 
 

Living people
1998 births
Place of birth missing (living people)
Cuban female sport wrestlers
Pan American Games medalists in wrestling
Pan American Games bronze medalists for Cuba
Medalists at the 2019 Pan American Games
Wrestlers at the 2019 Pan American Games
Central American and Caribbean Games bronze medalists for Cuba
Competitors at the 2018 Central American and Caribbean Games
Central American and Caribbean Games medalists in wrestling
20th-century Cuban women
21st-century Cuban women